Leo Marino Franciosi (born 28 August 1932) is a Sammarinese former sports shooter. He competed at the 1960, 1968, 1976 and 1980 Summer Olympics.

References

External links
 

1932 births
Living people
Sammarinese male sport shooters
Olympic shooters of San Marino
Shooters at the 1960 Summer Olympics
Shooters at the 1968 Summer Olympics
Shooters at the 1976 Summer Olympics
Shooters at the 1980 Summer Olympics